"Slow Poison" is a 2009 song by the American indie rock band The Bravery. It was the first single from their album Stir the Blood. It peaked at #23 on the Billboard Hot Modern Rock Tracks chart and at #40 on the Rock Songs chart.

References

2009 singles
2009 songs
The Bravery songs
Songs written by Sam Endicott
Island Records singles